Boot Hill Bandits is a 1942 American Western film directed by S. Roy Luby. The film is the fourteenth in Monogram Pictures' "Range Busters" series, and it stars Ray "Crash" Corrigan as Crash, John "Dusty" King as Dusty and Max "Alibi" Terhune as Alibi, with Jean Brooks, John Merton and Glenn Strange.

Cast
Ray Corrigan as Marshal "Crash" Corrigan
John 'Dusty' King as "Dusty" King
Max Terhune as "Alibi" Terhune
Elmer as Elmer, Alibi's Dummy
Jean Brooks as May Meadows
John Merton as Brand Bolton
Glenn Strange as The Maverick
I. Stanford Jolley as The Mesquite Kid
Steve Clark as Sheriff Jed Tolliver
George Chesebro as Henchman "Stack" Stoner
Richard Cramer as "Corn" Hawkins - Bartender
Budd Buster as Mayor Noah Smyth
Milburn Morante as Cameron
Jimmy Aubrey as The Drunk

External links

1942 films
1940s English-language films
American black-and-white films
1942 Western (genre) films
Monogram Pictures films
American Western (genre) films
Films directed by S. Roy Luby
Range Busters
1940s American films